Faces of Meth is a drug prevention project run by the Multnomah County Sheriff's Office in the U.S. state of Oregon.  The project uses mug shots of repeat offenders to demonstrate the harmful and damaging effects of methamphetamine on its users.  The idea for Faces of Meth began in 2004 when deputy Bret King of the Corrections Division Classification Unit used mug shots to identify individuals with a history of using methamphetamine.  King and his co-workers collected images of people charged with crimes related to methamphetamine addiction to document the change in physical appearance over time due to the use of the drug.  The project uses before and after mug shot photos to show the physical deterioration of the user as a result of using methamphetamine.  The images were originally used in educational slideshow and video presentations delivered to students in Oregon high schools. This Faces of Meth drug prevention strategy has since become popular across the United States.

Background
Steve Suo and Joseph Rose, staff writers for The Oregonian, began an investigation into the methamphetamine epidemic taking place on the West Coast of the United States in late 2002. Oregon was especially hit hard by methamphetamine at the time, with more addicts per capita than any other state.  Suo's story was published in October 2004 as "Unnecessary Epidemic", a five-part investigative series. Around the same time, deputy Bret King was working at the Multnomah County Detention Center when he witnessed a 20-year-old woman experience amphetamine psychosis in her cell.  After glancing at her mug shot and seeing how the drug had physically changed her appearance, King began to collect booking photos of methamphetamine users on a daily basis, eventually creating "the faces of meth", a slideshow of "the most extreme faces" altered by the devastating effects of meth use.

Two months later, on December 28, 2004, Rose published "Faces of Meth", the first to highlight the before and after photos King had collected. Rose's article discussed the development of King's drug prevention project and the physiological effects of methamphetamine on the human body. In May 2005, several of King's images were published as a public service poster in a partnership between The Oregonian and the Multnomah County Sheriff's Office.  King and the Faces of Meth project appeared on NBC Nightly News in August of that same year.  In February 2006, the public affairs television program Frontline aired "The Meth Epidemic", a documentary produced in association with The Oregonian. The Frontline episode featured King and showed images from the Faces of Meth project in the first segment, "Uncovering Meth's History and Spread".

Images and videos
The Faces of Meth project uses before and after mug shots of arrestees to demonstrate the harmful effects of using methamphetamine. The images often depict signs of premature aging, facial scarring from picking scabs, and advanced tooth decay, commonly referred to as meth mouth.  The Multnomah County Sheriff's Office has also published several slideshows and videos.  Faces of Meth was originally released in 2005 on a CD containing 59 images and a PowerPoint presentation for educating youths about the dangers of methamphetamine. This public education strategy, intended to discourage drug use, has since become popular across the United States.  According to Bret King, the images were effective in communicating the message of the drug prevention project:

<p>What I've observed when kids watch my program is they become pretty uncomfortable ... People cover up their faces. They can't look ... They feel sick to their stomach. But I think the most visible thing is their facial expression or the verbal utterances they make – gasps in the audience ... I want that shock value to be there. I want to make an impact that lasts with these people. I want them to not forget what they've seen.

In 2009, the Multnomah County Sheriff's Office released From Drugs to Mugs, a new 48-minute documentary and expanded update of the Faces of Meth drug prevention strategy.  The video "illustrates the dangers and potential outcomes of the decision to experiment with drugs" using interviews with inmates arrested for drug-related crimes and testimony from the people who work with them in the judicial system.  Questions in the interview were based on a 2008 survey of almost 500 high school students who were asked about the most important elements in their decision to use or abstain from using drugs.

Reaction
Reactions to the project were positive, but some concerns were raised about privacy law.  Max Margolis of Oregon Partnership's YouthLink Program described the shocking imagery as an "honest tactic", because "the damage to the body, the rapid degeneration – those are realities of the drug."  Douglas J. Edwards, Editor-in-Chief of Behavioral Healthcare, criticized the project's methods, stating that permission was not obtained from the subjects, and that the identities of the subjects could have been concealed using black bars to block the eyes.  According to the Faces of Meth project, all of the mug shots they use are public records and do not require permission.

See also
 Substance dependence
 Physical dependence
 Substance abuse

References

External links
 Project website  from the Multnomah County Sheriff's Office
 Frontline images
 Faces of Meth, Joseph Rose, The Oregonian Dec 28, 2004 
 Faces of Meth, 10 years later: Anti-drug campaign endures, as does effect on addicts' lives in The Sunday Oregonian, December 28, 2014

Culture of Portland, Oregon
Education in Oregon
Law enforcement in the United States
Methamphetamine in the United States
Works about drugs